Fourway, Virginia may refer to:
Fourway, Rappahannock County, Virginia
Fourway, Tazewell County, Virginia